Calmar Steamship Company was a proprietary subsidiary of the Bethlehem Steel founded in New York City in 1927.  Bethlehem Steel Company founded Calmar Steamship Company and other steamship companies after finding general shipping companies could not meet the company's needs in a timely manner. At the time Bethlehem Steel Company was the second-largest steelmaker in the United States and the world, only behind U.S. Steel. Calmar Steamship Company shipped Bethlehem Steel Company products from the Atlantic coast to the Pacific coast. On the return trip, Calmar Steamship Company would bring lumber products from the Pacific coast to the Atlantic coast. Calmar Steamship Company closed in 1976, as United States steel manufacture declined in the 1960s.

Ships
Ships:
SS Portmar a steam cargo ship built in 1919 
SS Corvus a steam cargo ship built in 1919 by Columbia River Shipbuilding Company 
Alamar, a steam cargo ship built in 1919  
SS Circinus  a steam cargo ship built in 1919
SS Oakmar sunk by U-71 on March 20, 1942, off Virginia
Calmar (1) a Type C4-class ship
Liberty ships that became Calmar ships:
Marymar, was SS Frederick H. Baetjer
Alamar (2), was Samuel F. B. Morse (2)
Massmar, was Alexander V. Fraser 
Flomar, was Arlie Clark
Seamar, was George M. Verity 
Kemmar, was George R. Holmes
Calmar was Vincent Harrington
Portmar, was Joseph B. Eastman  
Pennmar, was William S. Baer
Yorkmar, was Walter Kidde 
Lomar, was Morris Sigman
Texmar, was Harold O. Wilson

World War II

During World War II Bethlehem Steel Company had its subsidiary companies operated charter shipping to support the war. During World War II Bethlehem Steel Company had its subsidiary companies: Calmar Steamship Company and Interocean active with charter shipping for the Maritime Commission and War Shipping Administration. During wartime, the Companies operated Victory ships and Liberty ships. The ship was run by its crew and the US Navy supplied United States Navy Armed Guards to man the deck guns and radio. The most common armament mounted on these merchant ships were the MK II 20mm Oerlikon autocannon and the 3"/50, 4"/50, and 5"/38 deck guns.  After the war there were many surplus ships and much competition. Black Diamond Steamship Company continued to operate after the war, but closed in the 1955.

Calmar Steamship Company operated World War 2 Victory ships:
Blue Ridge Victory
Hagerstown Victory
Honduras Victory
Nashua Victory
Calmar operated World War 2 Liberty ships:
Andrew G. Curtin, Torpedoed Jan. 25, 1944 and sunk by U-716 at 73.20N 23.30E.
Thomas McKean, Torpedoed June 29, 1942 and sunk in Caribbean by U-505 at 22.00N 60.00W
Pierce Butler, Torpedoed Nov. 20, 1942 and sunk by U-177 in Indian Ocean at 29.53S 36.28E
Benjamin Harrison, Torpedoed March 16, 1943 and sunk by U-172 at 39.02N 24.15W.
James W. Denver, Torpedoed April 11, 1943 and sunk by U-195 west of Canary Islands 
James A. Butts
Roy K. Johnson
Flora MacDonald
Frank R. Stockton 
Frederick H. Baetjer
Frederick L. Dau
Flora MacDonald
Thomas Sully
Philip F. Thomas, sank in 1956 as PELAGIA 
Benjamin Chew
Christopher Newport
Thomas Nelson
Richard Henry Lee
Grace Abbott
William Paca
SS Eleazar Wheelock
James W. Wheeler
SS John H. B. Latrobe

See also
Interocean Shipping Company
Bethlehem Transportation Corporation
Ore Steamship Company

References 

Defunct shipping companies of the United States
Transport companies established in 1927
Transport companies disestablished in 1976
American companies established in 1927
1927 establishments in New York (state)
1976 disestablishments in New York (state)